Fudbalski klub Sloboda Tuzla (English: Football Club Sloboda Tuzla) is a Bosnian professional football club based in Tuzla, Bosnia and Herzegovina. The English translation of the team's name is Football Club Freedom Tuzla.

The club is a member of the Football Association of Bosnia and Herzegovina and has been active in the Premier League of Bosnia and Herzegovina since it was founded, an exception being a two-year stint of playing in the First League of the Federation of Bosnia and Herzegovina after the club got relegated to it in the 2011–12 Premier League season.

Sloboda got promoted back up to the Premier League in the 2013–14 First League of FBiH season, and has been playing in the country's top division since.

History

Foundation
FK Sloboda Tuzla was founded in 1919, as a part of the Labour Sport Society Gorki, named after the great socialist Russian poet Maxim Gorky. The football club and the labour society was popular in a wide part of the sporting public in Tuzla and beyond. The club was formed on the initiative of the Tuzla branch of the newly formed Communist party of Yugoslavia, under the influence of the ideas of the October revolution of 1917 and revolutionary movements in Yugoslavia and Bosnia and Herzegovina as its integral part.

After the initial congress of unification and the creation of the Socialist Labour Party (Communists) in Yugoslavia that took place in Vukovar, Croatia in 1919, the first conference of the Tuzla municipal organisation of the League of Communists of Yugoslavia took place on 17 October 1919 in Tuzla. The elected party council decided on the same day to start with the formation of a worker's sporting society. The official founding of the club took place in the end of October 1919, and gathering was led by Jovo Sretenović, Mato Vidović, Safet Hadžiefendić, Ljubko Simić, Niko Trifković and Petar Dugonjić.

The men elected into the first Board of directors of the club were: Leonard Bancher, Mato Vidović, Niko Trifković, Stjepan Brkljačić and Alfred Puhta, Mijo Cuvaj and Ahmed Mandžić, Franto Bauzek (locksmith), Emil Kranjčec, Jakov Čurić and Petar Dugonjić, Franjo Miškovski, Safet Hadžiefendić, August Mot and Karlo Schwartz. The origin of the original name of the sporting society, Gorki, was explained by Petar Dugonjić:

When the final preparations for the organising meeting were being dealt with, it was suggested that the club be named Sokolović, after Mićo Sokolović, a known worker's rights activist. Then Mitar Trifunović noticed: "People, few will know that we named the Club after our Mića. Most will think of Mehmed-paša Sokolović". The practical Franjo Rezač insisted we go to the meeting with a concrete name suggestion. Mitar Trifunović then said: "If no one objects, I would suggest the club bears the name of Maxim Gorky". I remember it well. Afterwards the name was accepted with enthusiasm at the meeting.

The first headquarters of the club was in Rudarska Street in Tuzla, not far from Skver is today. Afterwards the headquarters moved to the building of the Jewish Bank, then to the Grand Hotel and then back to Rudarska Street. The games were played on two fields – the first one was called the Communist playground between what today are the Chemical and Mechanical high-schools and the second one was the field where the Braća Ribar primary schools stands.

All the players were workers, and the Gorki first team had the following players: Mirko Veseli, Peri Mot, Karlo Krejči, Santo Altarac, Ivica Šifer, Franto Bauzek, Mijo Josić, Lorenc Ajhberger, Vili Zaboš, Slavko Zafani, Ahmed Mandžić, Alfred Puhta, Jozo Vikić, Malaga Mustačević, Dragoslav Stakić and several others. The coach was Brato Gamberger, former player of HŠK Zrinjski.

The club mostly played against other Tuzla football clubs. Namely, at the time of the formation of FK Gorki there were three other football clubs in Tuzla, Zrinjski, Obilić and Makabi, based around the Croatian, Serbian and Jewish population of Tuzla. In 1921 the Bosniak club Bura was also formed. Unlike these confessional clubs, FK Gorki was multinational and accepted members of all faiths and ethnicities.

It is important to note that the official ground of Tuzla in this period was the field of HŠK Zrinjski built in 1928 on the road to Solina from Brčanska Malta with the help of Kalman Liska, a wood merchant and president of HŠK Zrinjski.

FK Sloboda
In 1924, because of the country-wide ban of communist activities, FK Gorki was banned by the government of the Kingdom of Serbs, Croats and Slovenes under the orders of the infamous Obznana. There was an attempt to form another worker's club, called Hajduk, but this was also banned in 1924.

Foundation and activity between 1927 and 1941
Thanks to the perseverance of labour activists, on 20 November 1927 the Labour-cultural and sporting society Sloboda (Bosnian: Radničko-kulturno sportsko društvo Sloboda) was formed in Tuzla. The society initially had four sections: Sports, Tamburica, Choir and Amateur theatre. The first team of the sports section was: Karlo Mot, Nikola Kemenc, Suljo Nezirović, Alfred Puhta, Safet and Ešo Isabegović, Oto and Ivica Milinović, Josip Leder and Muho Mujezinović, Karlo Schwartz, Vlado Mileusnić, Jozo Kemenc, Rihard Žlebnik, Mujo Begić and many others.

In the beginning of 1928, the sports section becomes independent and renames itself to RSK Sloboda. Although officially under the influence of social-democrats, communists continue to have a substantial influence in the club, hence it is a continuation of the formerly banned FK Gorki. That is the reason the year of foundation is always considered to be 1919, the year when Gorki was formed and not 1928. The first game played by the new club was against FK Solvaj from Lukavac. Because of the discontinuation of several other Tuzla football clubs, like Obilić nad Bura, many players transferred to Sloboda and in 1928 it had a formidable team that consisted of the following players: Asim Mulaosmanović, Muho Mujeznović, Dejan Vujasinović, Mujko Mešković, Meša Selimović, Abdurahman Mujezinović Smrt, Vlado Mileusnić, Karlo Mot, Ivan Majer and others. It is a very interesting fact that Mehmed Meša Selimović, one of the greatest Bosniak writers of all time, played in Sloboda at this period.

Re-foundation in SFRY and rise to the top 1945–1992

During the time of former Yugoslavia, FK Sloboda was active in the Yugoslav First League and the team had much success, despite never winning the title. The best result was achieved in 1977 when FC Sloboda has qualified for the UEFA cup 1977–78. Unfortunately, Las Palmas from Spain was stronger, 5–0 in Spain for Las Palmas and 4–3 for FK Sloboda in Tuzla. This is a club with very rich history in former Yugoslavia giving many stars such as Mesud Nalić, Omer Jusić, Rizah Mešković, Mersed Kovačević, Fuad Mulahasanović, Ismet Hadžić, Dževad Šećerbegović, Mustafa Hukić, Midhat Memišević as well as young players members of U-20 national team such as Isanović, Ćulumarević, Milošević, Hajrulahović, Jogunčić.

Bosnian First League 1993–2000
In 1991 Sloboda was to be relegated from 1st Yugoslav league, but after Croatian and Slovenian teams left Yugoslav 1st league Sloboda was there for season 1992 but left league with Željezničar, Sarajevo and Velež after breakout of war. Until 2000 Sloboda played First League of NFSBiH, after 2000 Sloboda played Premier League of Bosnia and Herzegovina.

Season 1994–1995 was first season of Bosnian First League, Sloboda won Tuzla Group but lost in First Play-off Round from Bosna Visoko, and reached finals of National Cup, but lost to Čelik Zenica.

Next season saw Sloboda winning third place in League, top scorer was Nedim Omerović with 17 goals, same thing happens again in Cup, losing to Čelik.

In season 1996–1997 Sloboda declined and ended up tenth in First League. In Season 1997–1998 Sloboda missed Championship Playoff with Croat teams by 3 points.

Season 1998–1999 was turbulent one, by the end of first half of championship Sloboda was in relegation zone, on winter Mustafa Hukić took club over and made great success by reaching fifth place.

Season 1999–2000 started with huge expectations, fans expected great things, but on 7 August manager of Sloboda Mustafa Hukić died in car crash, and Sloboda ended up in 7th place and runner up in 3 team finals of National Cup.

Number of great players played for team during these years such as Vedin Musić, Muhamed Konjić, Sakib Malkočević, Nedim Omerović.

Premier League, decline and relegation 2000–2012

First League of FBiH (2nd tier of Bosnian football), back in top flight 2014–present

After 42 years, Sloboda got relegated from the top divisions (including both, Yugoslav and Bosnian football) to the First League of FBiH in the 2011–12 Premier League of Bosnia and Herzegovina season. They came back after their 2nd season of being relegated. In their first season after getting back to the top tier (2014–15), Sloboda finished at 8th place, recording the 2nd best performance of the spring part of the season (8–4–3).

Sloboda was the league leader of the first part of the 2015–16 Bosnian Premier League season. Until March 2016, the team were on an 18-game unbeaten run in the Premier League of Bosnia and Herzegovina dating back to 18 November 2015. The club took 2nd league place that season, managing also to achieve the Bosnian Cup final which was lost by Radnik Bijeljina (11 May – Tuzla: 1–1, 18 May – Bijeljina: 0–3).

The season 2016–17 was followed by turbulence. The club's board changed when Azmir Husić decided to leave the chairman seat in September and was replaced with Senad Mujkanović. The club took 5th place in the league at the end. That season left the fans with memories on one of the best come backs when Sloboda hosted Zrinjski Mostar on 19 November 2016. Zrinski had 3–0 after 51 minutes, but the Tuzla-based team managed to tie the game in the end in only 18 minutes.

The 2017–18 league season was entire to forget when the club took 10th position, just one place above relegation zone. However, through the 2017–18 Bosnian Cup, under the guidance of then manager Slavko Petrović, Sloboda made it all the way to the semi-finals, losing 4–1 on aggregate to eventual winner, Željezničar.

On 29 March 2019, the club chairman, Senad Mujkanović left Sloboda and, Sead Kozlić was named for the new club's chairman. Not even seven months after Kozlić was named as the new chairman, on 15 October 2019, Kozlić decided to step down from the position, while on the next day, 16 October, Elmir Šećerbegović became the new FK Sloboda Tuzla club chairman.

Supporters
Home team supporters from Stadion Tušanj, which are known as Fukare Tuzla, were established in 1987. The name originated from Red-Black Killers in the early 1970s.

Rivalry
Sloboda's main rival is Tuzla City, the other team from the city of Tuzla. The first match was played on 11 August 2018, when Tuzla City was the host. Sloboda won that game 1–0. Tuzla City's first derby win came on 31 August 2019, which finished 2–1 in favor of the younger Tuzla club.

Honours

Domestic

League
Premier League of Bosnia and Herzegovina:
Runners-up (1): 2015–16
First League of the Federation of Bosnia and Herzegovina:
Winners (1): 2013–14
Yugoslav First League:
Third place (1): 1976–77
Yugoslav Second League:
Winners (1): 1958–59

Cups
Bosnia and Herzegovina Cup:
Runners-up (7): 1994–95, 1995–96, 1997–98, 1999–2000, 2007–08, 2008–09, 2015–16
Yugoslav Cup:
Runners-up (1): 1970–71
Yugoslav League Cup (shared record):
Winners (1): 1971–72
Runners-up (1): 1972–73

European
UEFA Intertoto Cup:
Winners (1): 1983 (Joint Winner)

European record

Legend: GF = Goals For. GA = Goals Against. GD = Goal Difference.

List of matches

Players

Current squad

Players with multiple nationalities 
  Filip Erić
  Stojan Vranješ

Managerial history
 Ostoja Simić (mid 1960s)
 Đorđe Bjelogrlić (late 60s–early 70s)
 Mićo Duvančić (??–1976)
 Đorđe Gerum (1976–1977)
 Mustafa Hukić (1 June 1994 – 30 June 1996)
  Nedžad Verlašević (1 July 1996 – 30 June 1998)
 Mustafa Hukić (1 July 1998 – 7 August 1999)
 Abdulah Ibraković (1 September 2002 – 31 May 2003)
 Sakib Malkočević (1 July 2008 – 24 July 2009)
 Nermin Hadžiahmetović (5 September 2009 – 5 November 2009)
 Adnan Osmanhodžić (interim) (9 November 2009 – 8 December 2009)
 Sakib Malkočević (interim) (9 December 2008 – 25 December 2009)
 Vlatko Glavaš (7 January 2010 – 27 October 2010)
 Denis Sadiković (27 October 2010 – 8 March 2011)
 Ibrahim Crnkić (9 March 2011 – 25 September 2011)
 Darko Vojvodić (5 October 2011 – 30 April 2012)
 Vedran Kovačević (interim) (2012) (30 April 2012 – 3 May 2012)
 Abdulah Ibraković (3 May 2012 – 18 September 2012)
 Denis Sadiković (20 September 2012 – 9 February 2013)
 Smajil Karić (16 February 2013 – 11 January 2014)
 Miroslav Blažević (17 January 2014 – 3 June 2014)
 Denis Sadiković (1 July 2014 – 27 September 2014)
 Acácio Casimiro (30 September 2014 – 15 January 2015)
 Husref Musemić (15 January 2015 – 11 September 2016)
 Amir Spahić  (interim)  (11 September 2016 – 11 October 2016)
 Vlado Jagodić (11 October 2016 – 10 September 2017)
 Slavko Petrović (11 September 2017 – 8 June 2018)
 Admir Smajić (team manager) (8 June 2018 – 13 July 2018)
 Milenko Bošnjaković (8 June 2018 – 31 July 2018)
 Zlatan Nalić (31 July 2018 – 3 June 2019)
 Admir Smajić (team manager) (10 June 2019 – 1 October 2019)
 Mile Lazarević (18 June 2019 – 28 September 2019)
 Gradimir Crnogorac (interim) (1 October 2019 – 7 October 2019)
 Marijan Bloudek (7 October 2019 – 18 October 2019)
 Milenko Bošnjaković (18 October 2019 – 13 December 2019)
 Gradimir Crnogorac (18 December 2019 – 9 March 2021)
 Mladen Žižović (15 March 2021 – 24 March 2022)
 Amir Spahić (interim) (24 March 2022 – 23 June 2022)
 Adnan Jahić (23 June 2022 – 14 March 2023)

Presidents
 Ante Raos
 Salko Bukvarević
 Enver Bijedić
 Salih Šabović
 Davud Zahirović
 Mersad Kovačević
 Azmir Husić
 Senad Mujkanović
 Sead Kozlić
 Elmir Šećerbegović

Club ranking

UEFA coefficient

2020–21 season

As of 17 December 2020. Source

References

External links

FK Sloboda Tuzla at Facebook

 
Association football clubs established in 1919
Football clubs in Bosnia and Herzegovina
Sport in the Federation of Bosnia and Herzegovina
Sport in Tuzla
Football clubs in Yugoslavia
1919 establishments in Bosnia and Herzegovina